SWFC may refer to:

Shanghai World Financial Center, supertall skyscraper in Pudong, Shanghai, China
Sheffield Wednesday F.C., football club based in Sheffield, South Yorkshire, England
Sirocco Works F.C., a football club based in Northern Ireland
Solomon Warriors FC, a football club in the Solomon Islands
Southwest Forestry College, in Kunming, Yunnan, China